Make or MAKE may refer to:

Make (magazine), a tech DIY periodical
Make (software), a software build tool
Make, Botswana, in the Kalahari Desert
Make Architects, an architecture studio

See also 
Makemake (disambiguation)